Emmanuel Lacroix (born 27 August 1968) is a Paralympic athlete from France.

Biography
Emmanuel Lacroix is one of the few people to have competed in summer and winter paralympics multiple times.  He began his paralympic career in 1988 in the swimming pool, competing in A8 classification races and winning a bronze in the 100m butterfly and silver in the 100m backstroke and freestyle races.  He competed in 1992 in Barcelona but without success.  For the next summer games in 1996 Lacroix changed to athletics and won a bronze in the T44-46 classification 1500m and 5000m races. In 2000 he ran the 5000m and marathon, winning a silver in the 1500m and a bronze as part of the French 4 × 400 m relay team.  The 2004 Summer Paralympics brought a bronze in the 4 × 400 m.

In his first winter games, in 1994, he competed in the 7.5 km free technique LW5-8 biathlon and in cross-country skiing 10 km free, 5 km classical and 20 km classical technique for LW6/8.  He again competed in 1998 Winter Paralympics where he won a bronze, in the 15 km free technique race for LW5/7, 6l8 as well as competing over 20 km and 5 km classical styles.  His last paralympics was in 2006, in the 7.5 km and 12.5 km standing biathlon and the 5 km, 10 km and 20 km standing cross country skiing events.

References

External links 
 

Paralympic athletes of France
Paralympic cyclists of France
Paralympic biathletes of France
Paralympic cross-country skiers of France
Swimmers at the 1988 Summer Paralympics
Swimmers at the 1992 Summer Paralympics
Biathletes at the 1994 Winter Paralympics
Cross-country skiers at the 1994 Winter Paralympics
Athletes (track and field) at the 1996 Summer Paralympics
Biathletes at the 1998 Winter Paralympics
Cross-country skiers at the 1998 Winter Paralympics
Athletes (track and field) at the 2000 Summer Paralympics
Athletes (track and field) at the 2004 Summer Paralympics
Biathletes at the 2006 Winter Paralympics
Cross-country skiers at the 2006 Winter Paralympics
Paralympic silver medalists for France
Paralympic bronze medalists for France
Living people
Place of birth missing (living people)
Medalists at the 1998 Winter Paralympics
French male biathletes
1968 births
Medalists at the 1988 Summer Paralympics
Medalists at the 1996 Summer Paralympics
Medalists at the 2000 Summer Paralympics
Medalists at the 2004 Summer Paralympics
Paralympic medalists in athletics (track and field)
Paralympic medalists in swimming
Paralympic medalists in biathlon
French male middle-distance runners
French male freestyle swimmers
French male butterfly swimmers
French male backstroke swimmers
20th-century French people
21st-century French people